The UEFA Intertoto Cup (from , "between" and , "betting pool"), often abbreviated and more known in the German-speaking world as UI Cup and originally called the International Football Cup, was a summer football competition between European clubs. The competition was discontinued after the 2008 tournament. Teams who originally would have entered the Intertoto Cup now directly enter the qualifying stages of the UEFA Europa League from this point.

The tournament was founded in 1961–62, but was only taken over by UEFA in 1995. Initially, the tournament ended with a single champion, who received the Intertoto Cup.  Starting in 1967, the tournament ended with a number of group winners (7 to 14 winners, see below), who received cash prizes. When UEFA took on the tournament, it became a qualifier for the UEFA Cup, with 2 to 11 Intertoto winners (see below) advancing to the Second qualifying round of the UEFA Cup.

Any club who wished to participate had to apply for entry, with the highest placed clubs (by league position in their domestic league) at the end of the season entering the competition. The club did not have to be ranked directly below the clubs which had qualified for another UEFA competition; if the club which was in that position did not apply, they would not be eligible to compete, with the place instead going to the club which did apply.

The cup billed itself as providing both an opportunity for clubs who otherwise would not get the chance to enter the UEFA Cup and as an opportunity for sports lotteries (or pools) to continue during the summer. 
This reflects its background, which was as a tournament solely for football pools. In 1995, the tournament came under official UEFA sanctioning and UEFA Cup qualification places were granted. Initially, two were provided; this was increased to three after one year; but in 2006, it was again increased to the final total of 11.

History
The Intertoto Cup was the idea of Malmö FF chairman Eric Persson and the later FIFA vice-president and founder of the Inter-Cities Fairs Cup, Ernst B. Thommen, and the Austrian coach Karl Rappan, who coached the Switzerland national team at the 1938 FIFA World Cup and at the 1954 World Cup. The "Cup for the Cupless" was also heavily promoted by the Swiss newspaper Sport. It derived its name from Toto, the German term for football pools.

Thommen, who had set up football betting pools in Switzerland in 1932, had a major interest in having purposeful matches played in the summer break. UEFA were initially disinclined to support the tournament, finding its betting background distasteful; nevertheless they permitted the new tournament but refrained from getting officially involved. Clubs which qualified for one of the official continental competitions, such as the European Champions Cups and Cup Winners Cup, were not allowed to participate.

The first tournament was held in 1961 as the International Football Cup (IFC). Initially the Cup had a group stage, which led to knock-out matches culminating in a final. By 1967, it had become difficult to organize the games, and so the knock-out rounds and the final were scrapped, leaving the tournament without a single winner. Instead, group winners received prizes of CHF10,000-15,000.

By 1995, UEFA had reconsidered their opinion, took official control of the tournament and changed its format. Initially, two winners were given a place in the UEFA Cup. The success of one of the first winners, Bordeaux, in reaching the final of the 1995–96 UEFA Cup encouraged UEFA to add a third UEFA Cup place in 1996.

Many clubs disliked the competition and saw it as disruptive in the preparation for the new season. As a consequence, they did not nominate themselves for participation even if entitled. In particular, following its 1995 relaunch, clubs in England were sceptical about the competition; after initially being offered three places in the cup, all English top division teams rejected the chance to take part. Following the threat of bans of English teams from all UEFA competitions, the situation was eventually resolved with three English clubs entering weakened teams, and none of them qualified.

In following years, UEFA made it possible for nations to forfeit Intertoto places. For example, in 1998, Scotland, San Marino and Moldova forfeited their places, and England, Portugal, and Greece forfeited one of their two, Crystal Palace being the sole English entrant despite finishing bottom of the Premier League. Other clubs have built upon their success in the UI Cup, following it up with great campaigns in the UEFA Cup. Furthermore, UEFA rejected this assertion that the tournament is disruptive. They point out that in the 2004–05 season, two of the three 2004 Intertoto Cup winners went on to qualify directly for the Champions League, whilst the 3rd one qualified by winning its 3rd qualifying round tie (Schalke and Lille directly, Villarreal by winning their 3rd qualifying round tie).

In December 2007, following the election of new UEFA president Michel Platini, it was announced that the Intertoto Cup would be abolished as of 2009. This was a part of a range of changes that were to be made to the UEFA Cup/Champions League System. Instead of teams qualifying for the Intertoto Cup, they would now qualify directly for the qualifying stages of the UEFA Europa League, which was expanded to four rounds to accommodate them. The UEFA Europa Conference League was introduced in 2021 as a third-tier European tournament.

Format
When the competition was taken over by UEFA in 1995, the format was both a group stage and a knock-out stage; 60 teams were split into 12 groups of five with the 16 best teams then contesting the knock-out stage with two-legged ties at each stage, the two winning finalists qualifying for the UEFA Cup. In 1996 and 1997, just the 12 group winners entered the knock-out round, with now three finalists advancing. Nations were allocated places according to their UEFA coefficients, much as with other UEFA tournaments.

The group stage was scrapped for the 1998 tournament, which became a straight knock-out tournament, with clubs from more successful nations entering at a later stage. This arrangement lasted until 2005.

From the 2006 tournament, the format for the Cup changed. There were three rounds instead of the previous five, and the 11 winning teams from the third round went through to the second qualifying round of the UEFA Cup. The clubs which were furthest in the UEFA Cup would each be awarded with a trophy. The first club that received that trophy (a plaque) was Newcastle United.

Only one team from each national association was allowed to enter. However, if one or more nations did not take up their place, the possibility was left open for nations to have a second entrant. Seedings and entry were determined by each association. Teams from the weakest federations entered at the first round stage, while those from mid-level federations entered in the second round, and those from the strongest federations entered in the third round.

Results

Winners by year (non-UEFA)

1961–1967
The results shown are the aggregate total over two legs unless otherwise noted.

1967–1994
During this time there were no competition winners, as only group stages were contested. The outright winners (determined by their best champions) are marked in bold.

Region system (1967, 1968, 1970)

Non-region system (1969, 1971–1994)

Winners by year (UEFA)

1995–2005
The results shown are the aggregate total over two legs. Listed are each year's three teams (two in 1995) that won the final matches, qualifying them for the UEFA Cup.

2006–2008
Listed are all 11 teams that won the Intertoto Cup, qualifying for the UEFA Cup. The outright winners (determined by the best performance in the UEFA Cup) are marked in bold.

Statistics
From 2006 onwards, the final round was no longer termed as the "Final", but instead simply as the "Third Round". In addition, there were 11 winners, compared to three under the old system. The clubs which progressed furthest in the UEFA Cup were awarded with a trophy (plaque).

Organized by UEFA

Winners by club

Winners by nation

Overall

Winners by nation (including 2006–2008 co-winners)

See also
 List of UEFA Intertoto Cup winning managers
 UEFA club competition records
 UEFA Champions League
 UEFA Europa League
 UEFA Europa Conference League

Notes

References

External links
 
 Official UEFA site
 Official lotteries site
 Soccernet guide to Intertoto Cup: Part 1 and Part 2
  Enrico Siboni Web Site – Winners of UEFA Intertoto Cup

 
Recurring sporting events established in 1961
Recurring events disestablished in 2008
Intertoto Cup
1961 establishments in Europe
2008 disestablishments in Europe